Johm Rungsawang is a former Thai air force officer. He served as commander-in-chief of the Royal Thai Air Force from 1 October 2016 to 30 September 2018. Chaiyapruk Didyasarin was appointed as his successor.

References 

Living people
1958 births
Place of birth missing (living people)
Johm Rungsawang
Johm Rungsawang
Johm Rungsawang
Johm Rungsawang
Johm Rungsawang